Leo Riot is an American professional Vert Skater. Riot started skating when he was twelve years old in 1996 and turned professional in 2006. 
Riot spent nine months building a vert ramp in his home in North Carolina, he started in June 2009 and worked on it through January 2010. 

Best Tricks Fakie 1080, Flatspin 540

Vert Competitions
2005 ASA World Championships, Sacramento, CA - Vert: 5th
2004 Brian Piccolo Skatepark, Copper City, FL - Vert: 1st

References

External links

enquirerjournal.com
enquirerjournal.com
mssevent.com

1984 births
Living people
Vert skaters
X Games athletes